Deer Harbour was a village located east of Clarenville. The post office was established in 1894. The first Postmistress was Jemima King. The post office closed on October 13, 1967 due to de-population.

See also
 List of communities in Newfoundland and Labrador

Populated places in Newfoundland and Labrador